Lee Jae-wook (born May 10, 1998) is a South Korean actor and model. He made his acting debut in the science fiction thriller Memories of the Alhambra (2018–2019) and gained  popularity after starring in the office romance Search: WWW (2019). This project was quickly followed by a big screen debut in the war film The Battle of Jangsari (2019), and appearances in the school series Extraordinary You (2019) and melodrama When The Weather Is Fine (2020). After playing his first lead character in the romantic comedy Do Do Sol Sol La La Sol (2020), he rose to prominence with a notable role in the hit fantasy period drama Alchemy of Souls (2022) and its second part Alchemy of Souls: Light and Shadow (2022–2023).

Education
Lee Jae-wook attends Chung-Ang University, majoring in Department of Theater and Film. As of January 2023, he is taking a leave of absence.

Career

2018: Career beginnings
In December 2018, Lee started his acting career as a supporting character in the hit tvN television series Memories of the Alhambra as a hacker-programmer, starring Hyun Bin, whose agency VAST Entertainment recruited him immediately. In 2020, his photoshoot for the magazine "THE MASTERPIECE'" alongside actress Park Lee-hyun and fellow labelmate went viral. It was taken in the summer of 2018, before his official acting debut.

2019: Rise in popularity
In June 2019, Lee joined the main cast of tvN's Search: WWW alongside Lee Da-hee, which became a hot topic every episode. The sales of Cine21's over-the-month issue of "2019 Rising Star" surged because of Lee, who gained popularity for his role in the drama. In September of the same year, he made a successful big screen debut in the war film The Battle of Jangsari. In October of the same year, he played as the second male lead in MBC's Extraordinary You as the female lead's childhood friend-fiancé. The show's success earned Lee the title of Best New Actor at the  2019 MBC Drama Awards, and he was also nominated for Best New Actor – Television at the 56th Baeksang Arts Awards.

2020–present: Transition to lead roles and breakthrough
In February 2020, Lee was cast in a supporting role in the JTBC television series When The Weather Is Fine alongside Yang Hye-ji. In May of the same year, he was cast as the main male lead in the KBS2 television series Do Do Sol Sol La La Sol as the male counterpart of the main protagonist, played by Go Ara. He won the Excellence Award for Actor in a Miniseries for his outstanding performance in this drama at the KBS Drama Awards. He was also awarded Rookie of the Year and Actor of the Year – Rookie at the Asia Artist Awards and the 18th Brand of the Year Awards, respectively. Lee is recognized and commended for his serious and diverse acting range. Before the year ended, he appeared in a cameo role as his former drama character from Extraordinary You in tvN's True Beauty alongside Kim Hye-yoon. 

In April 2021, Lee signed with C-JeS Entertainment, after his contract with the previous agency had expired. In May of the same year, he made a special appearance in the Netflix series Move to Heaven.

In June 2022, Lee returned to the small screen with the tvN period fantasy drama Alchemy of Souls alongside Jung So-min. In the same month, he appeared in a cameo role as an actor in the Disney+ series Kiss Sixth Sense. In October, he was awarded the Global Excellence Award at the Korea Drama Awards for his contribution globally to the Hallyu wave. He was also honored with the Asia Special Award at the 17th Asia Model Awards. In December of the same year, he reprised his role as Jang Uk in Alchemy of Souls: Light and Shadow, alongside Go Youn-jung. At the end of 2022, he then won the Best Actor Award at the Asia Artist Awards.

Lee held his first fan meeting "2023 Lee Jae-wook Asia Tour Fan Meeting" starting from Seoul on January 14, 2023.

Endorsements
In February 2020, Lee became the new model for the contemporary casual brand AD HOC and the street casual brand N DOZEN. He is also one of the most popular models who is signed with high-end fashion brands like Prada, Lancôme, Dior, Nike, Berluti, Armani, Zegna, EX NIHILO, and Fendi. He has been featured in many prominent fashion publications. In January 2023, Lee became the new model for the premium scalp care brand, ScalpMed. In February 2023, Lee was selected as the brand model for the skin care brand, La Mer.

Filmography

Film

Television series

Web series

Ambassadorship

Awards and nominations

Listicles

Notes

References

External links 

  
 
 

1998 births
Living people
People from Seoul
Male actors from Seoul
21st-century South Korean male actors
South Korean male film actors
South Korean male television actors